Snow house or Snow House may refer to;
 Igloo, a shelter built of snow blocks, originally built by the Inuit
 Quinzhee, a shelter made by hollowing out a pile of settled snow

Places
in the United States (by state then city)
Dudley Snow House, Oxford, Alabama, listed on the NRHP in Calhoun County, Alabama
Holt–Peeler–Snow House, Macon, Georgia, listed on the National Register of Historic Places in Bibb County, Georgia
Munroe–Dunlap–Snow House, Macon, Georgia, listed on the National Register of Historic Places in Bibb County, Georgia 
Snow House (Lawrence, Kansas), listed on the National Register of Historic Places in Douglas County, Kansas
Lemuel Snow Jr. House, Somerville, Massachusetts, listed on the NRHP in Middlesex County, Massachusetts
Russ and Holland Snow Houses, Brecksville, Ohio, listed on the NRHP in Cuyahoga County, Ohio
John Snow House, Worthington, Ohio, listed on the NRHP in Franklin County, Ohio